"Moscow Nights" is one of the most famous Russian songs outside Russia.

Moscow Nights may also refer to:

"Moscow Nights", a song by The Feelies from their 1980 album Crazy Rhythms
Moscow Nights (1934 film), a French war drama film
Moscow Nights (1935 film), a British film
Moscow Nights (1994 film), a Russian film featuring Aleksandr Feklistov